Javier Casas Jr. (born May 14, 2003) is an American professional soccer player who plays as a midfielder for Major League Soccer club Chicago Fire.

Club career

Chicago Fire
Born in Melrose Park, Illinois, Casas joined the youth academy at Major League Soccer club Chicago Fire in 2015. On March 10, 2020, Casas signed a professional contract with the Chicago Fire, making him a homegrown player. He made his first appearance in the match day squad on July 14, 2020 against the Seattle Sounders FC, included on the bench but without coming on as a substitute.

Casas made his professional debut for the Chicago Fire on May 15, 2021, appearing as a second half substitute in a 1–0 defeat against D.C. United.

Forward Madison (loan)
On July 21, 2021, it was announced that Casas had joined USL League One club Forward Madison on loan, starting in the side's friendly match against Mexican club Atlético Morelia. He then appeared in his first league match for the club on July 24 in their 1–1 draw against Fort Lauderdale CF.

International career
Casas has represented the United States at the under-16 level, making his first appearance on May 15, 2019 against the Czech Republic. He also holds the option to be called up by Mexico.

Personal life
Born in the United States, Casas is of Mexican descent.

Career statistics

References

External links
 Profile at Chicago Fire

2003 births
Living people
People from Addison, Illinois
American soccer players
Association football midfielders
Chicago Fire FC players
Forward Madison FC players
Major League Soccer players
USL League One players
Homegrown Players (MLS)
Soccer players from Illinois
United States men's youth international soccer players
MLS Next Pro players
Chicago Fire FC II players